Velora alboplagiata is a species of beetle in the family Cerambycidae. It was described by Per Olof Christopher Aurivillius in 1927 and is known from Australia.

References

Desmiphorini
Beetles described in 1927